Tourism Industry Council Tasmania (also known as TICT) is an organisation based in Hobart, Tasmania, Australia.

It is the peak industry body for tourism in Tasmania, and issues related to the industry.

It also seeks to influence government in issues relative to strategy for the Tourism industry in Tasmania, either in partnership or advocacy with Tourism Tasmania

Notes

Organisations based in Tasmania
Tourism in Tasmania
Tourism organisations in Australia